Edwin Lawrence may refer to:

 Edwin Durning-Lawrence (1837–1914), British lawyer and Member of Parliament
 Edwin Lawrence (Michigan jurist) (1808–1885), American jurist and politician